Mead, an alcoholic beverage made by fermenting a solution of honey and water, is made in Alaska among other places. Because Alaska has no indigenous pollinators that produce honey, local honey is expensive, causing most Alaskan mead to be made from imported honey.

Active meaderies
 Alaska Meadery
 Two Seasons Meadery
 Hive Mind Meadery

Defunct meaderies
 Ring of Fire Meadery
 Celestial Meads

See also 
 List of Alaska breweries
 Mead in the United States

References

Mead
Wineries of the United States